Dicranodontium denudatum is a species of moss belonging to the family Dicranaceae.

Synonym:
 Dicranum aquaticum Ehrh.

References

Dicranales